A university charter is a charter issued by an authority to create or recognize a university. The earliest universities – Bologna, Paris and Oxford – arose organically from concentrations of schools in those cities rather than being created by charters. The first university charters were issued in Europe in the 13th century, with the University of Naples, created by a charter of Emperor Frederick II in 1224, being widely considered the first deliberately-created university (or studium generale); King Alfonso VIII of Castille issued a charter in 1208 to create the University of Palencia but the status of that institution is doubtful. The first papal creation was the University of Toulouse in 1229, via a papal bull of Pope Gregory IX. Through the 13th century, most university foundations continued to be organic, often by migrations of scholars from other universities, but by the start of the 14th century either a papal bull or an imperial charter was considered necessary.

Papal letters and bulls to create universities fell into four categories: Firstly, the creation of a new university where no school had existed before (e.g. Prague in 1347–48); secondly the refoundation of a university that had vanished or substantially declined (e.g. Perpignan in 1379); thirdly the apparent creation of a new university where one already existed (e.g. Montpellier in 1289); and finally the confirmation of an existing university (e.g. Salamanca in 1255).

Canada

Most Canadian universities derive their degree-granting authority from acts of the relevant provincial legislature (e.g. York University Act). Some older universities, including the University of Toronto and McGill University, derive their authority from a royal charter.

United Kingdom

Most universities founded prior to 1992 were created by royal charter, although a small number were established by acts of parliament. Chartered institutions – those incorporated by royal charter – differ from those established by other means in terms of their powers as a corporation, their legal relationship with the government, and the status of their members. Although university charters are issued as royal charters under the royal prerogative, the College Charter Act (1871) provides for scrutiny by the British parliament (or, since 1999, the Scottish parliament for institutions based in Scotland) of draft charters that establish "any institution in the nature of a college or university".

Oxford and Cambridge developed organically prior to the use of charters to establish universities, although Cambridge received a papal bull in 1318 that either confirmed its status as a studium generale or conferred this status upon it. Oxford and Cambridge were formally incorporated by Act of Parliament in 1571 and are civil, rather than chartered, corporations. Three of the ancient universities of Scotland (St Andrews, Glasgow and Aberdeen) were established by papal bulls, while Edinburgh was founded by the town corporation under authority granted to it by a royal charter. All four ancient Scottish universities are now governed under the Universities (Scotland) Acts.

Durham University was established by an Act of Parliament in 1832 and was later incorporated and confirmed by a royal charter in 1837. The University of London received four charters between 1836 (its founding charter) and 1863 but has been governed under an Act of Parliament since 1900. Durham and London are thus both statutory and chartered corporations. Newcastle University was separated from Durham and established as an independent university by an Act of Parliament in 1963 and is the only university established before 1992 to be a purely statutory corporation.

Since 1992, almost all new universities have been promoted to that status by orders under the Further and Higher Education Act 1992. However, supplemental charters have been used to confer university status on institutions that already had a royal charter, such as Cardiff University (previously part of the University of Wales and chartered in 1884) in 2004 and Imperial College London (previously part of the University of London and chartered in 1907) in 2007. Both new and supplemental charters have both been used to effect the merger of institutions to form a new university, such as the new charter granted to the University of Manchester in 2004 on the merger of the Victoria University of Manchester and the University of Manchester Institute of Science and Technology, and the supplemental charter granted to the University of Wales, Lampeter (chartered 1828 as St David's College) in 2010 to form the University of Wales Trinity Saint David by merger with Trinity College Carmarthen.

United States

Federal

In the United States, American University, Gallaudet University, Georgetown University, Howard University, and George Washington University are congressionally chartered universities, due to their location within the US's federal district. Georgetown University was the first federally chartered institution of higher education in the United States when President James Madison signed the university's charter into law on March 1, 1815.

The Institute of American Indian Arts was chartered by the federal congress in 1986.

The United States service (military) academies are not chartered as they are agencies of the federal government itself.

State
Other universities are chartered by the colonial governments or by state legislatures.

References

Government documents
Higher education
Education policy